Owen Philip Hawley (August 29, 1930 – July 31, 2006) and Ralph Lietz Schroeder (February 18, 1920 – October 26, 1976) were longlife partners living in Marietta, Ohio.

Early life
Owen Philip Hawley was born on August 29, 1930, in Chicago, Illinois, the son of Ida Peterson and Anthony Weber; he was later adopted by Clarence Edgar  Hawley and Alicia Myrtle Hevle.

Hawley grew up in Kenosha, Wisconsin. In 1952 he graduated from St. Olaf College, A.B. in 1952, where he was part of the Phi Beta Kappa. He majored in English, History, and French. He later became a Danforth Graduate Fellow and obtained an A.M. in 1954 from Harvard University in History and English.In the summer of 1951 he attended the Summer School Abroad in London, England, organized by the University of Minnesota.

Career
After graduation, Owen Hawley taught in Massachusetts, Minnesota, and Pennsylvania.  In the 1950s he was instructor in English at Union College, Barbourville, Kentucky, and lived in the Campus. In 1964 he took a position at Marietta College and became professor emeritus. He retired in 1990.

Hawley was a volunteer of the Washington County Historical Association and Washington County Public Library. Among his researches those about Ralph Waldo Emerson, Walt Whitman, and Vachel Lindsay.

In 1967 Hawley published "Orient pearls at random strung: Mr. Emerson comes to Marietta". In 1985 he published "Phi Beta Kappa Gamma of Ohio, Marietta College, 1860-1985: 125th anniversary history and directory" and in 1967 "Of no mean reputation: Charles Sullivan".

In 1962 Schroeder published "Where a lad is: an account of Vachel Lindsay". In 1973 he published "The history-go-round". In 1976, the same year of his death, Schroeder published "History of Washington County, Ohio: with illustrations and biographical sketches".

In 1996 Hawley published a study of the Mound Cemetery at Marietta (where he is now buried).

Personal life
Hawley and Schroeder lived at 401 Aurora St., Marietta, Ohio.

Owen Hawley and Ralph Schroeder are buried together at Mound Cemetery (Marietta, Ohio).

Legacy
Owen Hawley left his collection of books, including the Ralph Shroeder-Vachel Lindsay Collection, to various libraries, colleges, and historical societies.

References

Burials at Mound Cemetery (Marietta, Ohio)
Gay men
Marietta College faculty
University of Minnesota alumni
St. Olaf College alumni
Harvard University alumni
1930 births
1920 births
2006 deaths
1976 deaths